Znamenskoye is a rural locality (a settlement) in Sukhonskoye Rural Settlement, Mezhdurechensky District, Vologda Oblast, Russia. The population was 2 in 2002.

Geography 
Motyri is the nearest rural locality.

References 

Rural localities in Mezhdurechensky District, Vologda Oblast